Canola (lit. Grandmother Gye-choon) is a 2016 South Korean film starring Youn Yuh-jung and Kim Go-eun.

Synopsis 
The film tells the story of Gye-choon (Youn Yuh-jung), a female diver native to Jeju Island who is reunited with her granddaughter Hye-ji (Kim Go-eun) after 12 years of separation.

Cast

Main cast 
 Youn Yuh-jung as Gye-choon
 Kim Go-eun as Hye-ji
Lee Seul-bi as young Hye-ji

Supporting cast 
 Kim Hee-won as Suk-ho
 Shin Eun-jung as Myeong-ok
 Yang Ik-june as Choong-seop
 Choi Min-ho as Han-yi
 Ryu Jun-yeol as Cheol-heon
 Park Min-ji as Min-hee 
 Nam Tae-boo as Choong-hee
 Oh Hee-joon as Gye-choon's house member
 Jang Hyuk-jin as Real Estate Agent Byun
 Park Jung-chul as Attorney Seo
 Choi Moon-kyoung as green umbrella 1

Guest appearance 
 Kim Dae-myung as Fitness trainer

Remake 
The copyrights have been sold for an upcoming Chinese remake of the film.

Awards and nominations

External links 
 Daum

References 

2010s Korean-language films
South Korean drama films
2016 films
Films directed by Chang
2010s South Korean films